Coniogramme is one of three genera in the subfamily Cryptogrammoideae of the fern family Pteridaceae.  A cultivated species, Coniogramme pilosa, is known as "bamboo fern."

Species
Coniogramme affinis (C. Presl) Wall. ex Hieron.
Coniogramme africana Hieron.
Coniogramme ankangensis Ching & Hsu
Coniogramme caudata (Wall. ex Ettingsh.) Ching
Coniogramme centrochinensis Ching
Coniogramme crenatoserrata Ching & K.H. Shing
Coniogramme emeiensis Ching & K.H. Shing
Coniogramme falcata (D. Don) Salom.
Coniogramme falcipinna Ching & K.H. Shing
Coniogramme fraxinea (D. Don) Diels
Coniogramme gigantea Ching
Coniogramme gracilis M. Ogata
Coniogramme guangdongensis Ching
Coniogramme guizhouensis Ching & K.H. Shing
Coniogramme japonica (Thunb.) Diels—bamboo fern.
Coniogramme jinggangshanensis Ching & K.H. Shing
Coniogramme lanceolata Ching
Coniogramme lantsangensis Ching & K.H. Shing
Coniogramme latibasis Ching
Coniogramme longissima Ching & H.S.Kung
Coniogramme macrophylla (BI.) Hieron.
Coniogramme madagascariensis C. Chr.
Coniogramme merrilli Ching
Coniogramme ovata S.K. Wu
Coniogramme petelotii Tardieu
Coniogramme pilosa (Brackenr.) Hieron.
Coniogramme procera (Wall.) Fée
Coniogramme pseudorobusta Ching & K.H. Shing
Coniogramme pubescens Hieron.
Coniogramme robusta Christ ex Hieron.
Coniogramme rosthornii Hieron.
Coniogramme rubescens Ching & K.H. Shing
Coniogramme rubicaulis Ching
Coniogramme serrulata (BI.) Fée
Coniogramme simillima Ching
Coniogramme simplicior Ching
Coniogramme sinensis Ching
Coniogramme squamulosa Hieron.
Coniogramme subcordata Copel.
Coniogramme suprapilosa Ching
Coniogramme taipaishanensis Ching & Y.T.Hsieh
Coniogramme taipeiensis Ching
Coniogramme taiwanensis Ching
Coniogramme venusta Ching
Coniogramme wilsonii Hieron.

References

World species list of Coniogramme: https://web.archive.org/web/20090908035159/http://homepages.caverock.net.nz/~bj/fern/coniogramme.htm

Pteridaceae
Fern genera
Taxa named by Antoine Laurent Apollinaire Fée